Sigbjørn Molvik (born 4 September 1950 in Volda) is a Norwegian politician for the Socialist Left Party.

He was elected to the Norwegian Parliament from Telemark in 2001, but was not re-elected in 2005.

Molvik was a member of Kragerø municipality council during the term 1991–1995.

References

1950 births
Living people
Socialist Left Party (Norway) politicians
Members of the Storting
21st-century Norwegian politicians
People from Volda
Politicians from Telemark
People from Kragerø